Isabi (Maruhia) is a Papuan language spoken in Madang Province, Papua New Guinea.

References

Kainantu–Goroka languages
Languages of Madang Province